The 2012–13 Appalachian State Mountaineers men's basketball team represents Appalachian State University during the 2012–13 NCAA Division I men's basketball season. The Mountaineers, led by third year head coach Jason Capel, play their home games at the George M. Holmes Convocation Center and are members of the North Division of the Southern Conference.

Roster

Schedule

|-
!colspan=9| Regular Season

|-
!colspan=9| 2013 Southern Conference men's basketball tournament

References

Appalachian State Mountaineers men's basketball seasons
Appalachian State
Appalachian State
Appalachian State